Caryocolum anatolicum is a moth of the family Gelechiidae. It is found in Turkey.

References

Moths described in 1989
anatolicum
Moths of Asia